Spilopyra is a genus of leaf beetles in the subfamily Spilopyrinae. It is found in Australia and New Guinea.

The genus is distinguished from other genera in Spilopyrinae by highly contrasting patterns of metallic color on its head, pronotum and elytra.

Species
 Spilopyra safrina Reid & Beatson, 2010
 Spilopyra scratchley Reid & Beatson, 2010
 Spilopyra semiramis Reid & Beatson, 2010
 Spilopyra stirlingi Lea, 1914
 Spilopyra sumptuosa Baly, 1860

References

External links
 Australian Faunal Directory – Genus Spilopyra Baly, 1860

Chrysomelidae genera
Beetles of Australia
Insects of New Guinea
Taxa named by Joseph Sugar Baly